Samuel Smith (July 27, 1752April 22, 1839) was an American Senator and Representative from Maryland, a mayor of Baltimore, Maryland, and a general in the Maryland militia. He was the older brother of cabinet secretary Robert Smith.

Smith served twice as President pro tempore of the United States Senate, first from 1805 to 1808 and later from 1828 to 1831.

Biography

Samuel Smith was born in Carlisle in the Province of Pennsylvania. His grandfather, also named Samuel Smith (1698–1784), was born in Ireland and settled in the Province of Maryland. Smith moved with his family to Baltimore, Maryland, in 1759. He attended a private academy, and engaged in mercantile pursuits until the American Revolutionary War, at which time he served as captain, major, and lieutenant colonel in the Continental Army. Prior to the war, as a young captain, he was sent to Annapolis to arrest Governor Eden and seize his papers.

On September 23 with Philadelphia on the verge of capture, Washington sent Smith, then a Lieutenant Colonel of the 4th Maryland Regiment with a detachment of Continentals into the fort on Mud Island on the Delaware River. Smith's force numbered 200 soldiers plus Major Robert Ballard of Virginia, Major Simeon Thayer of Rhode Island, and Captain Samuel Treat of the Continental Artillery. However, another account stated that Thayer did not reach Fort Mifflin until October 19. With the British army closing in on Philadelphia, the small force had to reach Fort Mifflin by a circuitous route. On the last leg of their journey, reinforcements for Mud Island had to be ferried across the Delaware from Red Bank, New Jersey under the protection of the Pennsylvania Navy river flotilla commanded by John Hazelwood. The fort was eventually overwhelmed by weeks of British bombardment and was abandoned. After his service in the war, Smith engaged in the shipping business.

Colonel Smith was admitted as an original member of The Society of the Cincinnati of Maryland when it was established in 1783. He went on to serve as the vice president (1804-1828) and president of the Maryland Society (1828-1839), serving in the latter capacity until his death.
From 1790 to 1792, Smith was a member of the Maryland House of Delegates. At the time of the threatened war with France in 1794, he was appointed brigadier general of the Maryland militia and commanded Maryland's quota during the Whiskey Rebellion.

Smith entered into national politics when he was elected to the Third United States Congress, serving from March 4, 1793, until March 4, 1803. As a Congressman, Smith served as chairman of the U.S. House Committee on Commerce and Manufactures (Fifth through Seventh Congresses). As a principal negotiator between the young Federalist leader and Delaware representative, James Asheton Bayard II, and the presumptive President-Elect Jefferson, Smith secured the winning ballot in the United States House of Representatives for Jefferson during the 1800 United States presidential election.  Smith entered into the Senate election in 1802, and was elected as a Democratic-Republican to the United States Senate. He was re-elected in 1808 and served from March 4, 1803 until March 4, 1815. While senator, Smith served as President pro tempore of the Senate during the Ninth and Tenth Congresses.

Smith served as a major general of Maryland militia during the War of 1812, and commanded the defenses of Baltimore during the Battle of Baltimore in September 1814. The American victory there can largely be attributed to Smith's preparation for the British invasion.

Smith was elected to the Fourteenth Congress on January 31, 1816 to fill the vacancy caused by the resignation of Nicholas R. Moore, and was re-elected to the Fifteenth, Sixteenth, and Seventeenth Congresses. In the House, Smith served as chairman of the U.S. House Committee on Expenditures in the Department of the Treasury (Fourteenth Congress), and as a member of the Committee on Ways and Means (Fifteenth through Seventeenth Congresses).

On December 17, 1822, Smith resigned as congressman, having been elected as a Democratic-Republican (later Crawford Republican and Jacksonian) to the United States Senate to fill the vacancy caused by the death of William Pinkney. In March–April 1824, Samuel Smith was honored with a single vote at the Democratic-Republican Party Caucus to be the party's candidate for U.S. Vice President at the election later that year.

Smith served as President Pro Tempore of the Senate again during the Twentieth and Twenty-first Congresses, and as chairman of the Committee on Finance (Eighteenth and Twentieth through Twenty-second Congresses). He was re-elected in 1826 and served until March 4, 1833. Two years later, in 1835, Smith became mayor of Baltimore, and served in that position until 1838, when he retired from public life. Smith died in Baltimore in 1839, and is interred in the Old Westminster Burying Ground.

Attitude toward slavery
In 1828 Smith served as Vice-President of the Maryland State Colonization Society, of which Charles Carroll of Carrollton, one of the co-signers of the Declaration of Independence, was president. The MSCS was a branch of the American Colonization Society, an organization dedicated to returning black Americans to lead free lives in African states such as Liberia.

References

External links

Samuel Smith at History Central
"The Samuel Smith Land Grants: A historical study of land ownership and use in southern West Virginia"
 The Society of the Cincinnati
 The American Revolution Institute

1752 births
1839 deaths
People from Carlisle, Pennsylvania
People of colonial Pennsylvania
People of colonial Maryland
American people of Irish descent
Democratic-Republican Party members of the United States House of Representatives from Maryland
Democratic-Republican Party United States senators from Maryland
Jacksonian United States senators from Maryland
Maryland Jacksonians
Presidents pro tempore of the United States Senate
Members of the Maryland House of Delegates
Mayors of Baltimore
Continental Army officers from Maryland
Maryland in the War of 1812
People from Maryland in the War of 1812
American militia generals
Burials at Westminster Hall and Burying Ground